Jessica Savona (born July 19, 1994) is a Canadian artistic gymnast and an alternate for the 2012 Summer Olympics team.  After the Olympics, she will attend and compete for Louisiana State University.

Junior career

2008 
In February, Savona tore her right anterior cruciate ligament while performing her beam dismount and had surgery to repair it in May.

2009 
In June, Savona competed at the Canadian Championships in Hamilton, Canada.  She placed sixth in the floor finals with a score of 12.750

Senior career

2010 
In May, Savona competed at the Canadian Championships in Kamloops, Canada.  She placed fourth in the all around final with a score of 54.650.  In event finals, she placed fourth on uneven bars scoring 13.000 and third on balance beam scoring 13.850.  She said, "I had my first meet back from surgery at the 2009 Canadian Championships. That did not go so well because I came in 13th, and it was a bad meet. Many people thought I was finished and I couldn't get back to where I was. But I guess my determination, hard work and my mental strength led me to my recent success placing fourth at the recent national championships, making the world championships team and traveling to my first ever worlds competition!"

In October, Savona competed at the 2010 World Artistic Gymnastics Championships.  She contributed to Canada's thirteenth place finish with scores of 13.800 on vault, 12.716 on uneven bars, and 13.700 on floor.  Before the competition she said, "I think our team's strongest suits will be our determination to show the world that we are coming back, and that we are all able to do high-level gymnastics compared to the rest of the world."

2011 
In May, Savona competed at the Canadian Championships in Charlottetown, Canada.  She placed second in the all around final with a score of 53.750.  In event finals, she placed first on balance beam scoring 13.475 and first on floor scoring 13.850.  "I came here expecting to hit my routines," Savona said. "I wasn't expecting to win on beam and my floor wasn't as good as in the all around but I'm proud of how I did."

In July, Savona tore her left anterior cruciate ligament while performing on vault.  She had surgery to repair it in August and began simple rehabilitation three days later.  "(Randy Foster, her physiotherapist) is saying that the recovery on the left knee is a lot better than my right, and my left knee seems to be healing a lot faster with more progress than what was seen with my right," Savona told International Gymnast Magazine in September. "Therefore, he and I believe that I will hopefully be back sooner than expected, without forcing anything, and pushing my knee to its limits, of course."

2012 
In May, Savona competed at the Canadian Championships in Regina, Canada.  She placed fourth in the all around final with a score of 54.800.  In the event finals, she placed sixth on the balance beam, scoring 13.050 and fifth on floor, scoring 13.450.

At the end of June, Savona was one of the twelve gymnasts chosen to compete at the Final Olympic Selection meet in Gatineau, Canada.  On the first day of competition she placed fourth in the all around with a score of 53.700.  Based on her performances here and at the Canadian Championships she was named as the first reserve for the team that will compete at the 2012 Summer Olympics.

References

External links
 Jessica Savona on Twitter
 Jessica Savona at Gymnastics Canada
 Jessica Savona at Fédération Internationale de Gymnastique

1994 births
Canadian female artistic gymnasts
Living people
Gymnasts from Toronto
Sportspeople from Etobicoke
20th-century Canadian women
21st-century Canadian women